The McCollum memo, also known as the Eight Action Memo, was a memorandum, dated October 7, 1940 (more than a year before the Pearl Harbor attack), sent by Lieutenant Commander Arthur H. McCollum, who "provided the president with intelligence reports on [Japan]... [and oversaw] every intercepted and decoded Japanese military (though the military code had not been broken) and diplomatic report destined for the White House" in his capacity as director of the Office of Naval Intelligence's Far East Asia section.  It was sent to Navy Captains Dudley Knox, who agreed with the actions described within the memo, and Walter Stratton Anderson.

The memo outlined the general situation of several nations in World War II and recommended an eight-part course of action for the United States to take in regard to the Japanese Empire in the South Pacific, suggesting the United States provoke Japan into committing an "overt act of war". The memo illustrates several people in the Office of Naval Intelligence promoted the idea of goading Japan into war: "It is not believed that in the present state of political opinion the United States government is capable of declaring war against Japan without more ado [...] If by [the elucidated eight-point plan] Japan could be led to commit an overt act of war, so much the better."

The McCollum memo was first widely disseminated with the publication of Robert Stinnett's book Day of Deceit: The Truth About FDR and Pearl Harbor. Stinnett writes that McCollum's memo was a plan to "mobilize a reluctant America into joining Britain's struggle against the German armed forces then overrunning Europe. Its eight actions called for virtually inciting a Japanese attack on American ground, air, and naval forces in Hawaii, as well as on British and Dutch colonial outposts in the Pacific region."  Stinnett presents the memo as part of his argument that the Roosevelt Administration conspired to secretly provoke the Japanese to attack the United States in order to bring the United States into the European war without generating public contempt over broken political promises. Stinnett attributes to McCollum a position McCollum expressly repudiated.

The Eight-Action plan 

The McCollum memo contained an eight-part plan to counter rising Japanese power over East Asia, introduced with this short, explicit paragraph:

It is not believed that in the present state of political opinion the United States government is capable of declaring war against Japan without more ado; and it is barely possible that vigorous action on our part might lead the Japanese to modify their attitude.  Therefore the following course of action is suggested:

A. Make an arrangement with Britain for the use of British bases in the Pacific, particularly Singapore
B. Make an arrangement with the Netherlands for the use of base facilities and acquisition of supplies in the Dutch East Indies
C. Give all possible aid to the Chinese government of Chiang-Kai-Shek
D. Send a division of long range heavy cruisers to the Orient, Philippines, or Singapore
E. Send two divisions of submarines to the Orient
F. Keep the main strength of the U.S. fleet now in the Pacific[,] in the vicinity of the Hawaiian Islands
G. Insist that the Dutch refuse to grant Japanese demands for undue economic concessions, particularly oil
H. Completely embargo all U.S. trade with Japan, in collaboration with a similar embargo imposed by the British Empire

If by these means Japan could be led to commit an overt act of war, so much the better.  At all events we must be fully prepared to accept the threat of war.

Reception of the Eight Actions 

The memo was read and appended by Captain Knox, who, despite being seemingly reluctant to "precipitate anything in the Orient", ultimately concurs. Specifically, he wrote (p. 6):

It is unquestionably to our interest that Britain be not licked – just now she has a stalemate and probably can't do better. We ought to make certain that she at least gets a stalemate. For this she will probably need from us substantial further destroyers and air-reinforcements to England.  We should not precipitate anything in the Orient that would hamper our ability to do this – so long as probability continues. If England remains stable, Japan will be cautious in the Orient. Hence our assistance to England in the Atlantic is also protection to her and us in the Orient. However, I concur in your courses of action. We must be ready on both sides and probably strong enough to care for both.

Stinnett writes that while "no specific record has been found by the author indicating whether [Anderson] or Roosevelt actually ever saw it [...] a series of secret presidential routing logs plus collateral intelligence information in the Navy files offer conclusive evidence that they did see it". His evidence of "secret presidential routing logs" is not provided. Stinnett goes on to write, "throughout 1941, it seems, provoking Japan into an overt act of war was the principal policy that guided FDR's actions against Japan" and "Roosevelt's cabinet members, most notably Secretary of War Henry L. Stimson, are on record favoring the policy, according to Stimson's diary". Further evidence that suggests Roosevelt had seen the memos was his support of "pop-up" cruises, an elaboration upon Actions D and E of the eight recommended actions detailed in the memo: "I just want them to keep popping up here and there and keep the Japs guessing.  I don't mind losing one or two cruisers, but do not take a chance on losing five or six."

Admiral Husband E. Kimmel, on the other hand, opposed the "pop-up" cruises, saying they were "most ill-advised and will result in war if we make this move", but "the decision [on the 'pop-up' cruise matter] may go against me". In fact, at the time, Kimmel was not aware of Washington's eight-action policy.

Admiral James O. Richardson also opposed the plan and "quoted the President as saying: 'Sooner or later the Japanese would commit an overt act against the United States and the nation would be willing to enter the war'."

Also, Admiral Nimitz turned down the command of the Pacific Fleet  so that he would not become the scapegoat if the Japanese attacked the United States by surprise. In a History Channel interview, Admiral Chester Nimitz Jr. described his father's political maneuver: 

He said, 'It is my guess that the Japanese are going to attack us in a surprise attack.  There will be a revulsion in the country against all those in command at sea, and they will be replaced by people in positions of prominence ashore, and I want to be ashore, and not at sea, when that happens.'

The characterization of the McCollum memorandum as a recipe for war was not accepted by U. S. Army military historian Conrad Crane, who wrote:

A close reading shows that its recommendations were supposed to deter and contain Japan, while better preparing the United States for a future conflict in the Pacific. There is an offhand remark that an overt Japanese act of war would make it easier to garner public support for actions against Japan, but the document's intent was not to ensure that event happened.

See also
Day of Deceit: The Truth About FDR and Pearl Harbor
Pearl Harbor advance-knowledge conspiracy theory
Hull note

References

External links

 Full Text of McCollum Memo and Knox's Endorsement

Attack on Pearl Harbor
Memoranda
World War II documents
Office of Naval Intelligence
1940 documents